Su Gavaber or Su Gavabor may refer to:
 Su Gavaber, Langarud
 Su Gavabor, Rudsar